Tadeusz Pluciński (25 September 1926 – 23 April 2019) was a Polish actor. He appeared in more than 40 films and television shows beginning in 1951.

Selected filmography

 Warsaw Premiere (1951)
 Westerplatte (1967)
 Stawka większa niż życie (1967)
 Podróż za jeden uśmiech (1972)
 Czterdziestolatek (1974)

References

External links

1926 births
2019 deaths
Actors from Łódź
Polish male film actors
Polish male stage actors
Knights of the Order of Polonia Restituta
Recipients of the Gold Cross of Merit (Poland)
Recipients of the Silver Medal for Merit to Culture – Gloria Artis
Recipient of the Meritorious Activist of Culture badge